Caim is a demon in Western demonology.

Caim may also refer to:
 Caim, Anglesey, a hamlet in Wales
 Caim (Dungeons & Dragons), a devil in the Dungeons and Dragons fictional universe
 Caim, a character in the Drakengard series of video games
 Caim, a village near Enniscorthy, County Wexford, Ireland

See also 
 Kaim (disambiguation)
 Came (disambiguation)